"Moby Dick - Rehearsed" is a 1965 Australian TV play based on the 1955 play Moby Dick - Rehearsed by Orson Welles. It was shot in Sydney.

Plot
A stage is set for a performance of King Lear. However the actor-manager has something else in mind - for his cast to do a rehearsed reading of Moby Dick.

Cast
Wynn Roberts as Ahab
Keith Alexander as Starbuck
Ed Devereaux as Stubb
Des Rolfe as Flask
Michael Thomas as young actor, also Ishmael
Patricia Connolly as Pip
Stewart Ginn
Tom Farley
David Copping
Alex Cann
Tommy Dysart
Guy Le Claire

Production
The set was designed by Geoffrey Wedlock.

Reception
The TV critic for the Sydney Morning Herald called it "very exciting television...  Ken Hannam's production was compelling and always visually interesting, especially in the use of focus."

The Canberra Times called it "a fine actors play, but, let us face it, a pretty boring one" but praised the work of Wynn Roberts and Patricia Connolly.

References

1965 television plays
1965 Australian television episodes
1960s Australian television plays
Wednesday Theatre (season 1) episodes
Works based on Moby-Dick
Films directed by Ken Hannam